Die glühende Gasse is a 1927 German silent film directed by Paul Sugar and starring Hans Albers, Egon von Jordan and Hermann Vallentin.

The film's sets were designed by the art director Franz Seemann.

Cast
 Hans Albers as Der vornehme Fremde 
 Egon von Jordan as Prinz Arsen de Rohan 
 Hermann Vallentin as Van der Meulen, ein Finanzmann 
 Helga Thomas as Diane, seine Tochter 
 Eduard von Winterstein as Bankier Raimond 
 Angelo Ferrari as Jean Coupot, der Artist 
 Hanni Weisse as Ninon, die Tänzerin 
 Gyula Szöreghy as Der lebensmüde Wirt 'Zum goldenen Ochsen' 
 Adolphe Engers as Snyders, ein merkwürdiger Bräutigam 
 Bertold Reissig as Spruit 
 Karl Harbacher as Der Hauswirt 
 Paul Morgan
 Bernd Aldor
 Aruth Wartan
 Hugo Döblin
 Victor Hartberg
 Alexander Murski

References

Bibliography
 Bock, Hans-Michael & Bergfelder, Tim. The Concise CineGraph. Encyclopedia of German Cinema. Berghahn Books, 2009.

External links

1927 films
Films of the Weimar Republic
German silent feature films
German black-and-white films